This is a list of notable people from Lexington, Massachusetts. It includes people who were born or raised in, lived in, or spent significant portions of their lives in Lexington, or for whom Lexington is a significant part of their identity. This list is in order by primary field of notability and then in alphabetical order by last name.

Athletes

Baseball
 Mary Dailey (1928–1965), All-American Girls Professional Baseball League player
 Carlton Fisk, Hall of Fame catcher for Boston Red Sox and Chicago White Sox

Basketball
 Dane DiLiegro, professional basketball player
 Dennis Johnson, guard for the Boston Celtics
 Rollie Massimino, led Villanova Wildcats to basketball national championship in 1985, former Lexington High School teacher and coach

eSports
 Rumay "Hafu" Wang, eSports player

Figure skating
Aimee Buchanan (born 1993), American-born Olympic figure skater for Israel

Football
 Dave DeGuglielmo, U.S. football coach
 Steve Leach, former NHL player

Hockey
 Claude Julien,  head coach for the Boston Bruins

Mountaineering

 Bradford Washburn (1910–2007), mountaineer
 Barbara Washburn (1914–2014), first woman to summit Denali

Soccer
 Robbie Mustoe, former English Footballer, current ESPN analyst

Artists and designers

Architects 

 Jean B. Fletcher & Norman C. Fletcher, founders of The Architects Collaborative in Cambridge, Massachusetts with Bauhaus veteran Walter Gropius
 John C. Harkness & Sarah P. Harkness, founders of The Architects Collaborative
 Robert S. McMillan founder of The Architects Collaborative
 Louis A. McMillen founder of The Architects Collaborative
 Walter Pierce, modernist architect, whose work included the Peacock Farm development in Lexington
 Ben Thompson, founder of The Architects Collaborative and Design Research store
 Hugh Stubbins, designer and owner of Lexington's first modernist house

Artists 

 Harold Dow Bugbee, Western artist
 Rachel Dratch, cast member of Saturday Night Live
 Scott McCloud, cartoonist
 Hermann Dudley Murphy early twentieth-century still-life and landscape painter

Fashion 

 Ryan Jude Novelline, contemporary artist and fashion designer

Crime 
 Charles Ponzi, con man, bought mansion in Lexington during 1920 (see Ponzi scheme)
 Aafia Siddiqui, neuroscientist convicted of assaulting with a deadly weapon and attempting to kill U.S. soldiers and FBI agents (alleged Al-Qaeda operative)

Entertainment industry

Actors 
 G. Hannelius, child actress
 Dionne Quan, voice actress
 Dane DiLiegro, actor

Comedians 
 Orny Adams, comedian
 Pete Holmes, comedian
 Mehran Khaghani, comedian
 Eugene Mirman, comedian
Rachel Dratch https://en.m.wikipedia.org/wiki/Rachel_Dratch

Television figures 
 Russell Morash, pioneer of 'how-to' television, creator and producer of the PBS shows "The Victory Garden," "This Old House," and "New Yankee Workshop"
 Tom Silva, building contractor and co-host of the PBS show This Old House
 Ethan Zohn, winner of Survivor: Africa

Military 
 Sidney Burbank, officer in the U.S. Army during the American Civil War
 John Parker, captain of the Lexington militia at the Battle of Lexington & Concord

Musicians and bands

 Francis Judd Cooke, composer
 Alan Dawson (1929–1996), famous jazz drummer and percussion teacher
 Brad Ellis, composer and pianist appearing on the television show Glee (TV Series)
 John Flansburgh, one half of alternative rock duo They Might Be Giants
 Bill Janovitz, lead singer and guitarist of the rock and roll band Buffalo Tom
 Jon Landau, music critic and former manager for Bruce Springsteen 
 Andrew McMahon, musician, lead vocalist and songwriter of Jack's Mannequin and Something Corporate
 Matt Nathanson, musician
 Amanda Palmer, songwriter, vocalist, pianist of the duo The Dresden Dolls

News and commentary
 Joyce Kulhawik, arts and entertainment anchor for WBZ-TV news
 Bill Lichtenstein, Peabody Award-winning journalist, filmmaker, radio producer

Political figures, activists and civil servants
 Bill McKibben, environmentalist
 Peter Orszag, economist, Director of the Office of Management and Budget
 Jill Stein, 2012 and 2016 Green Party presidential candidate

Religious leaders
 Dana Greeley, last president of the American Unitarian Association and first president of the Unitarian Universalist Association
 Theodore Parker, Unitarian minister and Transcendentalist
 Clarence Skinner, Dean of Crane School of Theology at Tufts University and influential 20th-century American Universalist

Scientists and academics

 Henry David Abraham, M.D., psychiatrist
 David Adler, physicist and MIT professor
 Alice Standish Allen, the first female engineering geologist in North America
 Charles Bachman, computer scientist and early developer of database management systems
 Kenneth Bainbridge, physicist and director of the Trinity test during the Manhattan Project
 Nariman Behravesh, economic forecaster
 Tim Berners-Lee, computer scientist and creator of the World Wide Web
 Andrea Bertozzi, mathematician
 Carolyn R. Bertozzi, Nobel Prize in Chemistry
 Konrad Bloch, Nobel Prize in Medicine
 Nicolaas Bloembergen, Nobel Prize in Physics
 Noam Chomsky, professor of linguistics at MIT, creator of the theory of generative grammar, noted political activist, commentator, and author
 Wesley A. Clark, American physicist and computer scientist, credited with designing the first modern personal computer
 John M. Deutch, Deputy Secretary of Defense (1994–1995), Director of Central Intelligence (DCI) (1995–1996) and professor of chemistry at MIT
 Peter A. Diamond, 2010 Nobel Prize in Economics, Professor of Economics at MIT
 Pavel Etingof, mathematician, fellow of the American Mathematics Society, and professor at MIT
 Henry Louis Gates, Jr., African-American Studies scholar, co-editor of Encarta Africana encyclopedia
 Peter Glaser, pioneer in solar energy engineering
 George B. Grant, inventor of calculators and gear industry pioneer
 Jonathan Gruber, professor of Economics at MIT and former Deputy Assistant Secretary of the U. S. Treasury 
 Cyrus Hamlin, co-founder of Robert College in Istanbul
 Oliver Hart, 2016 Nobel Prize in Economics, Professor of Economics at Harvard
 Yu-Chi Ho, mathematician
 Gerald Holton, American physicist, historian of science, and educator
 Jon Kabat-Zinn, creator of Mindfulness-based stress reduction
 Charles P. Kindleberger, economic historian
 Gerald S. Lesser (1926–2010), psychologist who played a major role in developing the educational programming included in Sesame Street
 Abraham Loeb, chair of Astronomy department and director of the Institute for Theory & Computation, Harvard University
 Salvador Luria, Nobel Prize in Medicine
 Douglas Melton, pioneer of stem cell research
 Mario Molina, Nobel Prize in Chemistry
 Joseph Nye, political analyst, author of Soft power
 Cathy O'Neil, Data Scientist, Occupier and blogger at mathbabe. LHS Grad
 Cecilia Payne-Gaposchkin, astronomer known for her work on spectral analysis of stars. Awarded the Henry Norris Russell Lectureship by the American Astronomical Society in 1976
 John Rawls, philosopher; known for his theory of justice
 Oliver Selfridge, computer scientist, pioneer in the field of artificial intelligence
 Clifford Shull, Nobel Prize in Physics
 Robert Solow, Nobel Prize-winning economist
 John Tate, mathematician and 2010 Abel Prize winner
 Samuel Ting, Nobel Prize in Physics
 Sheila E. Widnall, aerospace researcher and educator at MIT, former Secretary of the Air Force
 Edward Osborne Wilson, entomologist and two-time Pulitzer Prize-winning author

Writers
 Joseph Dennie, writer
 David Elkind, child psychologist and author
 Philip Elmer-DeWitt, science editor for Time Magazine
 Tama Janowitz, author, Slaves of New York (1986)
 X. J. Kennedy, noted poet and writer
 Francis Rosa, journalist for The Boston Globe
 Ruth Sawyer, author, winner of the Newbery Medal
 Simon Schama, historian, art historian and presenter
 Edward Osborne Wilson, entomologist and two-time Pulitzer Prize-winning author

References

Lexington
Lexington, Massachusetts